Niklas Sandberg may refer to:

 Niklas Sandberg (footballer, born 1978), Swedish footballer
 Niklas Sandberg (footballer, born 1995), Norwegian footballer